The Beach kabaddi at the Asian Beach Games is a Beach kabaddi competition of the Asian Beach Games. It was first held in 2008.

Summary

Men

Women

Medal table

Participating nations

Men

Women

References

External links
International Kabaddi Federation

 
Beach kabaddi
Asian Beach Games